Orapin Chaiyakan (born May 6, 1904) was a Thai politician and teacher. She was born in Ubon Ratchathani, studied education in Bangkok, and served as headteacher of Narinukun School from 1924 to 1940. She was the first woman to be elected to hold a post in the Parliament of Thailand. Specifically, she was elected to become a member of the House of Representatives of Thailand on June 5, 1949. She was elected as a representative for Ubon Ratchathani Province. She was a member of the Democrat Party.

References

Orapin Chaiyakan
Orapin Chaiyakan
Orapin Chaiyakan
20th-century women politicians
Orapin Chaiyakan
Orapin Chaiyakan
1904 births
1996 deaths
Orapin Chaiyakan
Orapin Chaiyakan
Orapin Chaiyakan